Vingroup Joint Stock Company, is the largest conglomerate of Vietnam, focusing on technology, industry, real estate development, retail, and services ranging from healthcare to hospitality. The company was founded by property developer and entrepreneur Phạm Nhật Vượng.

History
Vingroup was founded in Ukraine on August 8, 1993 as Technocom, originally producing dried foods, such as instant noodles, mainly under the Mivina brand by Phạm Nhật Vượng. 

In 2000, the company began operations in Vietnam. 

In 2006, Vinpearl Land, the first amusement park was opened in Nha Trang.

In 2007, Vingroup was listed on the Ho Chi Minh City Stock Exchange.

In 2010, Vingroup sold its Ukraine operation to Nestlé for $150 million USD.

In October 2014, Vingroup bought the supermarket chain OceanMart in a move to gain market share in the retail industry, and renamed it VinMart. 

In September 2015, Vingroup launched a major animal conservation program on Phú Quốc, Vietnam's largest island. 

In October 2015, Vingroup bought the Vietnamese supermarket chain Maximark.

In 2016, Vingroup began operating their Vinmec healthcare and Vinschool education subsidiaries as non-profits. 

In September 2017, Vingroup started construction of a car factory for the VinFast subsidiary.

In May 2018, 10% of Vinhomes was made public on the Ho Chi Minh City Stock Exchange. The 25 year anniversary of Vingroup was celebrated by the opening of the Vingroup owned Landmark 81 tower in Ho Chi Minh City, the tallest completed building in Southeast Asia at the time. 

In October 2018, Vingroup announced that VinFast, its car division, would become the first domestic car manufacturer, with an annual production capacity of 250,000 cars. $3.5 billion was invested in the development of this project. 

In December 2018, Vingroup entered the smartphone market with the launch of VSmart phones, running on Android. The smartphones are produced by the VinSmart unit.

In November 2018, the city of Hanoi announced that the city would be hosting a Formula 1 Grand Prix starting in April 2020, with Vingroup as the promoter of the project. The race was later cancelled due to the COVID-19 pandemic.

In 2019, Vingroup automobile subsidiary VinFast introduced three new combustion vehicles. 

In March 2019, Vingroup acquired the e-wallet platform MonPay. 

In May 2019, South Korean conglomerate SK Group bought a 6.1% stake in Vingroup for $1 billion.

In February 2020, Vinpearl Land rebranded as VinWonders

In May 2021, Vingroup announced that it would cease the production of smartphones and televisions.

On February 9, 2022, Nikkei reported that Vingroup lost approximately $1.05 billion in 2021 "at its manufacturing segment last year due to sluggish sales of gasoline-powered cars at home and growing investments in the emerging electric vehicle business."

Subsidiaries

 Vinhomes: Residential real estate development
 VinFast: Automobile, cars, and motorbike manufacturing
 VinBus: Operator of electric buses
VinSmart: Smartphones and televisions
 Vincom: Shopping malls (Vincom Centre, Vincom Plaza, Vincom Mega Mall, Vincom+)
 VinPearl: Resorts
 VinSchool: K-12 Education
 VinWonders : Amusement parks and attractions such as an ice skating rink and a water park and Vinpearl Safari Phu Quoc.
 VinMec: Officially opened in 2012, VinMec currently consists of 7 general hospitals and 2 clinics.
 VinUniversity: Higher education institution, in partnership with Cornell University and University of Pennsylvania
 VinFa: Pharmaceutical
 VinID: Technology product development – providing Fintech, Loytal and Digital Marketing services with roughly 7 million users in 2019.
VinCommerce: Convenience stores (VinMart+) and supermarkets (VinMart). Controlling stake sold to Masan Group in 2019, but VinGroup retains a large stake. South Korean conglomerate SK Group has agreed to acquire a 16.3%
 VINCSS: Network Security Services
Vincom Office: Office real estate
VinES (Vin Energy Solution): EV battery manufacturer
 VinBigData: Big Data
 VinAI: Artificial Intelligence
 Thien Tam Fund: Philanthropical organization on behalf of Vingroup

References

External links 

 
 

 
Conglomerate companies established in 1993
Real estate companies established in 1993
1993 establishments in Vietnam
Vietnamese companies established in 1993
Conglomerate companies of Vietnam